Cairn Mountain is in the Beartooth Mountains in the U.S. state of Montana. The peak is in the Absaroka-Beartooth Wilderness in Custer National Forest.

References

Cairn
Beartooth Mountains